This is a list of events that took place in the year 1995 in Azerbaijan.

Incumbents 
 President: Heydar Aliyev
 Prime Minister: Fuad Guliyev 
 Speaker: Rasul Guliyev

January 

 11 January  - Establishment of diplomatic relations between Uruguay and Azerbaijan

February 

 18 February - Law on the reform of state and collective farms 
 28 February - Establishment of diplomatic relations between Azerbaijan and Nepal

March 

 Establishment of the State Commission on Agrarian Reform 
 March 2 - Establishment of diplomatic Relations between Azerbaijan and Burundi

April 

 14 April - Adoption of the Statute of the State Commission on Agrarian Reforms

May 

 3 May - The launch of the first Internet network at the Azerbaijan National Academy of Sciences
 22 May - Establishment of diplomatic relations between Azerbaijan and Laos

November 

 12 November - Adoption of Constitution of Azerbaijan
 12 November - First Azerbaijani parliamentary election

References 

 
Azerbaijan
Azerbaijan